Gilbert Fuentes (born February 21, 2002) is an American professional soccer player who plays as an attacking midfielder.

Club career

Youth
Fuentes began playing for the San Jose Earthquakes academy side in 2016, first with his regular age group in the U15s. During the 2017-18 academy season, he moved up to the U19 squad and scored three goals in eight appearances. Previously, he played for Ballistic United SC.

In November 2017, TopDrawerSoccer.com listed Fuentes as the fourth best player and top midfielder in the nation for the class of 2020. He was only one of five players in the country to be given a five-star ranking by the website.

San Jose Earthquakes
San Jose signed Fuentes to a Homegrown contract on January 26, 2018. He was the team's third Homegrown signing of 2018, following the signings of teammates JT Marcinkowski and Jacob Akanyirige, and at the time of his signing was the club's youngest ever player and the youngest ever athlete for a Bay Area sports team.

Borussia Dortmund had competed with San Jose for Fuentes' signature before he signed his Homegrown contract, due in part to the fact that he works with the same agent as Christian Pulisic.

On May 3, 2021, Fuentes joined USL Championship side Austin Bold on a season-long loan.

International career
Fuentes made eight appearances for various United States Soccer Federation youth teams in 2017. He was a starter for the U15 squad at the 2017 CONCACAF Boys' Under-15 Championship, including in the United States' loss to Mexico in the tournament final, and was called up to the  United States U17 in November for the Men's Nike International Friendlies, and again in January 2018 for the first-ever USYNT Summit Camp.

Also eligible for both Guatemala and El Salvador, it was announced on January 23, 2021 that Fuentes would switch to El Salvador U23 ahead of the CONCACAF Olympic Qualifying Championship, but was left out of the 20-man squad.

Personal
Fuentes is of both Guatemalan and Salvadoran descent which allows him to play for both Guatemala and El Salvador national teams as well as the United States national team having been born in the U.S. His father is from Guatemala and his mother from El Salvador.

Career statistics

References

External links

MLS profile

2002 births
Living people
American soccer players
Homegrown Players (MLS)
San Jose Earthquakes players
Reno 1868 FC players
Austin Bold FC players
Association football midfielders
Soccer players from California
People from Tracy, California
Major League Soccer players
USL Championship players
American sportspeople of Salvadoran descent
American people of Guatemalan descent
American sportspeople of North American descent
Sportspeople of Guatemalan descent
Citizens of El Salvador through descent
United States men's youth international soccer players